Peter Burney  is a British epidemiologist. He is emeritus professor of respiratory epidemiology and public health at the National Heart and Lung Institute, Imperial College London. He is a Fellow of the Academy of Medical Sciences since 2001.

Education and career 
He studied Modern History at University of Oxford, trained in Medicine at the Middlesex Hospital Medical School and then Public Health at St Thomas Hospital Medical School. He became the Chair in Public Health Medicine at United Medical and Dental Schools of Guy's and St Thomas’ in 1995, and then Head of the Division of Public Health and Primary Care at King’s College London. He also led the Social Medicine and Health Services Research Unit, which was funded by the Department of Health. In 1996, he was Chair of the Respiratory Disease Committee of the International Union Against Tuberculosis and Lung Disease. He moved to Imperial College London in 2006.

Burney led several important and pioneering international collaborative studies on asthma and allergy, including the European Community Respiratory Health Survey (ECRHS) and the GA2LEN epidemiological study, and on COPD with the Burden of Obstructive Lung Disease (BOLD) study. As result of his work, he has provided evidence on asthma and allergy to the Lords Select Committee on Science and Technology in 2006 and has been interviewed by mainstream media. In 2014, he contributed to a European Respiratory Society video about the Burden of COPD - ERS Vision.

Significant publications

References 

Living people
Epidemiologists
Alumni of the University of Oxford
1949 births
Fellows of the Academy of Medical Sciences (United Kingdom)
Imperial College Faculty of Medicine
Fellows of the Royal College of Physicians
Fellows of the Faculty of Public Health
Middlesex Hospital
Alumni of St Thomas's Hospital Medical School
Academics of King's College London